Donald Clayton Bergus (February 26, 1920 South Bend, St. Joseph County, Indiana, USA – April 12, 1998) was a US career diplomat and expert on south-west Asia.

Born in 1920 in South Bend, Indiana to George and Grace Bergus, Donald then went on to study Law at the University of Chicago. In 1942, Donald was appointed to the Foreign Service, beginning his 40-year-long service, and initially sent to Baghdad.

In 1967, as the Egyptian government severed diplomatic relations with the US government, Bergus was appointed to represent his country's interests in Cairo by managing the US Interests Section from the Spanish embassy. He held that position until February 1972, when succeeded by Joseph Nathaniel Greene. In 1977-1980 he served as US Ambassador to Sudan.

Donald died in 1998 leaving behind his wife, Elizabeth R Bergus, and his three grown children.

External links
 Text of one of Bergus' diplomatic cables from Cairo in 1967
 Text from an interview with Donald Bergus in 1991

1920 births
1998 deaths
Ambassadors of the United States to Sudan
People from South Bend, Indiana
United States Foreign Service personnel
University of Chicago alumni
American expatriates in Egypt